Ellen Angelinawaty (born 30 June 1976) is a former Indonesian badminton player and now is a badminton coach in PB Djarum. Born in Salatiga, Central Java, Angelina who play in the singles category, had won the Malaysia and Indonesia International tournaments in 1997. She reach the final at the 2000 Asian Championships, and clinched the silver medal after lose to Xie Xingfang of China. At the same year, she competed at the Summer Olympics in Sydney, Australia. At the peak of her career, she won the 2001 Indonesia Open, beating the Chinese player Wang Chen in the final.

Achievements

Asian Championships 
Women's singles

IBF World Grand Prix 
The World Badminton Grand Prix has been sanctioned by the International Badminton Federation from 1983 to 2006.

Women's singles

 IBF Grand Prix tournament
 IBF Grand Prix Finals tournament

IBF International 
Women's singles

References

External links 
 
 
 

1976 births
Living people
People from Salatiga
Sportspeople from Central Java
Indonesian female badminton players
Badminton players at the 2000 Summer Olympics
Olympic badminton players of Indonesia
Competitors at the 1999 Southeast Asian Games
Southeast Asian Games gold medalists for Indonesia
Southeast Asian Games medalists in badminton
Badminton coaches
20th-century Indonesian women
21st-century Indonesian women